Eudaronia jaffaensis is a species of sea snail, a marine gastropod mollusk, unassigned in the superfamily Seguenzioidea.

References

  Verco, J.C. 1909. ''Notes on South Australian marine Mollusca with descriptions of new species. Part XII; Transactions of the Royal Society of South Australia v. 33 (1909)

External links
 To World Register of Marine Species

jaffaensis
Gastropods described in 1909